Services Selection Board (SSB) is an organization that assesses the candidates for becoming officers into the Indian Armed Forces. The board evaluates the suitability of the candidate for becoming an officer using a standardized protocol of evaluation system which constitutes personality, intelligence tests, and interviews. The tests are of both types i.e. written and practical task-based. An SSB comprises the panel of assessors, who are officers in the Indian Armed Forces and having their specialization as Psychologist, GTO (Group Task Officer), and Interviewing Officer. At times the psychologist may not be directly from the armed forces as well. In total there are thirteen Service Selection Boards across India, out of which four boards are for the Indian Army, four boards are for Indian Air Force, and five boards for the Indian Navy. SSB is a 5 days evaluation process.

Introduction
There are a variety of pathways to be commissioned as an officer in Indian Armed Forces. This applies to both for civilians (after 10+2, graduation and post-graduation), as well as for serving armed forces personnel. All except army medical corps members must succeed in the "SSB interview". There is no limit to the number of attempts that can be made. There are however limits to the number of attempts one can make to the tests like the NDA/NA UPSC and PABT(Indian Air Force). The interview involves a battery of psychological tests of personality, to assess the candidate's suitability for getting inducted into the armed forces. The tests help the SSB select candidates with officer like qualities ("OLQs"). The Services Selection Board is not concerned with the number of commissions available. Its responsibility is just to assess and then, recommend. Successful candidates have a medical examination and if satisfactory are recorded on a "merit list" before training and commission. Merit list doesn't consider the medical results, but to get a call letter to join the academy based on the number of vacancies available, being medically fit is mandatory. 

The selection occurs over a five-day process. Day 1 - Screening test, Day 2 - Psychological evaluation, Days 3 and 4 - Group tests, and Day 5 - a compilation of results in conference. A personal interview is also included during the selection period. The qualities looked for in the selection period include intellect, responsibility, initiative, the judgment under stress, ability to reason and organize, communication skills, determination, courage, self-confidence, speed in decision making, willingness to set an example, compassion and a feeling of loyalty to the nation. The candidates are billeted during the selection period and complete the assessment in a group with other candidates. Observations of the group are constant.

Procedure
The candidates who have passed the Union Public Service Commission (UPSC) written examination, or who, in the case of the Territorial Army have been recommended by a Preliminary Interview Board (PIB), or, who have been asked to present to the Service Selection Board are allocated an SSB center to attend. Service candidates attend via movement orders made by their superiors.
Various entries like Technical entry and NCC special entry gets direct call letter to attend SSB.
The selection is based on the concept of Manasa, Vacha, and Karmana. The personality of the candidate is observed by the officers using various tests for candidates like psychology test, interview, and GTO tasks.
There are no right or wrong answers in SSB as every individual acts in a different way to the same situation. The aim is to check whether the candidate is the right fit to become an officer in the defense force.

Day 0
On the day candidate has to report, he has to follow the instructions as mentioned in the SSB call letter. Generally, the candidate has to report at the railway station in the morning between 7 Am – 8 Am, and from there, candidates are escorted to the board by one of the SSB officials. On the very same day, candidates are made to sit in the testing hall where they have to present their educational documents for verification and are allotted a number (called chest number) by which they will be able to identify the candidates throughout the process. A briefing about the schedule, various tests and general instructions shall be given.

Day 1, Screening test – Stage I
On Day 1, stage one of testing is administered. This includes a verbal and non-verbal intelligence test  (About 50 questions each) and then a Picture Perception and Description Test (PPDT). In this test, a picture, either clear or hazy is shown to the candidates for 30 seconds. Each candidate observes it and then, in the next minute, must record the number of characters seen in the picture. Then within a given time, each candidate must write nearly seventy words, make a story from the picture (not just describe the picture). The candidate must record the mood, approximate age and gender of the first character they saw, known as the "main character". In stage two of the PPDT, the candidates are given their stories which they may revise. Each candidate in the group must narrate his or her story within one minute. The group is then asked to create a common story involving each of them or their perceived picture stories.

After the completion of these tests, unsuccessful candidates are dismissed. Other candidates are short-listed. They must complete the first of the five personal information questionnaires which must be recorded in the same manner. The personal information questionnaire is the main basis for the individual candidate interview.

Day 2, Psychology test – Stage II
On Day 2, a thematic apperception test (TAT) or picture story writing is administered. It is similar to the PPDT, but the picture used is clear. Again the candidates are shown a picture for thirty seconds and then write a story in the next four minutes. Twelve such pictures are shown sequentially. The last picture is a blank slide inviting the candidates to write a story of their choice. Candidates do not need to remember the number of characters in each picture and there is no group discussion.

The next test will be the Word Association Test (WAT). The candidates are shown sixty simple everyday words in sequence. Each is shown for fifteen seconds. For each word, the candidates write the first thought that comes to mind in response to the word. Other tests administered on day two are the Situation Reaction Test (SRT) in which a booklet of 60 situations is given in which the responses are to be completed in 30 minutes and finally the Self Description Test (SDT) which consists of 5 questions asking about the candidate's parent's, teacher's, friend's and his or her own perception.

Days 3 and 4, Group test is conducted by a GTO (Group Testing Officer) – Stage III
On the third and fourth days, there are tasks including group discussion; group (military) planning exercises; progressive group tasks; small (half) group tasks; individual tasks (obstacles); group obstacle or "snake race"; command tasks; a lecturette with four heads; two group discussion on current as well as on social and personal topics and a final group task. Along with GTO, an individual candidate interview is conducted by the interviewing officer. It is based on the personal information questionnaires filled by the candidates on day 1 and other general and defense knowledge.

Day 5, final assessment and results (Conference)
On day five, All the officers in proper uniform will attend a conference with each candidate. They will also have a conversation with a panel of assessors. The assessors will look for confidence and expression when speaking; a positive attitude in adversity and in life; honesty. Following this, the final results are announced. Successful candidates will remain for an intensive medical examination which takes four to five days at a military hospital.

Pilot Aptitude Battery Test (PABT – Once in a lifetime Test)
{Now this test is exchanged with CPSS} Pilot Aptitude Battery Test (PABT) is administered to candidates hoping to join the Flying Branches only of the Indian Air Force, Indian Navy, Indian Army or Indian Coast Guard. The PABT is conducted during the SSB interview. Candidates may sit the PABT only once. 
The PABT includes the Instrument Battery Test, a Sensory Motor Apparatus Test (SMAT), and a Control Velocity Test (CVT).

More recently, the "Computerized Pilot Selection System" (CPSS) has been used. It was created by the former president of India Dr. A.P.J. Abdul Kalam with the Defence Institute of Psychological Research and the Air Defence Establishment, groups within the Defence Research and Development Organisation. It was developed to determine aptitude for use of intellect with respect to advanced aircraft.

CPSS machine simulates an aircraft cockpit. Video games played by the candidate on a screen in front of him are scored best of three games. It tests hand, leg, vision, and hearing coordination.

Instrument Battery Test
The Instrument Battery Test (INSB) is a paper, pencil, and machine-based test. It has two parts. The candidate must listen to a briefing and then interpret the dials of an instrument panel of an aircraft. If the candidate does well, they proceed to the machine part of the test.  The machine test includes the Sensory Motor Apparatus Test (SMAT) and the Control Velocity Test (CVT) which examine a candidate's co-ordination. The tests are administered in one day and candidates may only ever attempt the tests once.

Indian Coast Guard Selection Board
The Indian Coast Guard (ICG) is part of the Ministry of Defence. ICG officer selection is similar to SSB and is conducted in two phases. Phase 1 is called the Preliminary Selection Board Exam (PBS) which is similar to the SSB screening stage. Phase 2, the Final Selection Board, includes psychological tests, group tasks, a personal interview, and an assessor's conference. Shortlisted candidates proceed to later test.

See also
 List of Public service commissions in India

References

Bibliography 

 

Military education and training in India
Military of India
Standardised tests in India
Union Public Service Commission
Indian Army officers
Year of establishment missing